Ignace Tonené (Nias) (1840/41–1916), also known by his Ojibwe name  (translating as "right/correct sun") was a Teme-Augama Anishnabai chief, fur trader, and gold prospector. He was a prominent employee of the Hudson's Bay Company.

Tonené was the elected deputy chief before being the lead chief and later the life chief of his community. In his role as deputy, he negotiated with the Canadian federal government and the Ontario provincial government, advocating for his community to receive annual financial support from both. His attempts to secure land reserves for his community were thwarted by Ontario premier Oliver Mowat.

Tonené's gold prospecting triggered a 1906 staking rush and the creation of the Kerr Addison gold mine, although one of his claims over the gold was stolen from him by white Canadian prospectors.

Early life 
 was most commonly known by his English name Ignace Tonené, often shortened to Nias. He was born in 1840 or 1841 near Lake Temagami in the Temagami First Nation in Upper Canada. He was the eldest son of François Kabimigwune and Marian, and grandson of Temagami chief White Bear. His brother was Frank White Bear (died 1930).

Career and community leadership 
From 1857, Tonené worked for the Hudson's Bay Company, delivering mail between its trading posts at Lake Timiskaming and Lake Temagami. He also worked at Fort Témiscamingue where he likely learned French.

Temagami leadership 
Around 1868, Tonené was elected as deputy chief taking over the role from his father. In 1877, Tonené filed a land claim concerning the Temagami region with the Parry Sound federal Indian Agent. In 1878, Tonené took over as head chief. He oversaw the adoption of potato farming and cattle raising. As chief, Tonené was noted for his principles, advocating to the community that debts must be paid, including to the Hudson's Bay Company. Unlike other First Nations surrounding Lake Huron, Tonené's community were not party to the Robinson Treaties. The treaties were two 1850 formal agreements between Ojibwa chiefs and the Crown in which chiefs relinquished land in exchange for an immediate and ongoing financial payments. Tonené advocated for redress and support for his people. Tonené was concerned about the impact of lumberjacks and their impact on the natural resources. He advocated to federal Indian agent Charles Skene for the provision of an annuity payment and the creation of reserve.

During a speech in January 1879, Tonené warned his community: “the white men were coming closer and closer every year and the deer and furs were becoming scarcer and scarcer ... so that in a few years more Indians could not live by hunting alone.”

He continued to press the government for federal financial support and the creation of a reserve through a series of meetings and letters written in Anishinaabe, which resulted in an acknowledgement from Indian agent Deputy Superintendent Lawrence Vankoughnet in 1880 that approximately 2,800 square miles of Temagami land was indeed unceded. Initially, Canadian Prime Minister John A. Macdonald deferred the matter to the Ontario Premier, but in 1883, the Department of Indian Affairs agreed to an annual payment to the nation. The payments were comparable to the amounts received by other First Nations who were parties to Robinson Huron Treaty. In 1884, Tonené convened a tribal council on Bear Island to discuss the potential location for the reserve; the community agreed it should be about 100 square miles surrounding Cross Lake and at the south end of Lake Temagami. The federal government agreed to the proposal, but the Ontario Premier Oliver Mowat, who had a reputation for hostility towards to Indigenous treaty rights, blocked the land transfer, primarily concerned about the value of the red and white pine lumber at the location.

In 1888, after Oliver Mowat's refusal to create the reserve, and as his chiefdom ended, Tonené moved his family to land between Lake Opasatica and Lake Dasserat near Abitibi, Quebec. In 1889, he travelled to Bear Island to meet Indian agent Thomas Walton and ask for seeds and farming equipment for his community. Tonené hunted and trapped to feed his family, and in 1903 starting prospecting, motivated by the recent silver discovery at Cobalt, Ontario. His successful finds of gold instigated the Larder Lake gold rush of 1906, according to the Canadian Mining Journal. The gold that he discovered at McGarry later became the Kerr-Addison mine, and staked at least one claim there which was subsequently stolen from him by white settlers. The Tonene Old Indian Mining Company issued a prospectus just prior to the start of World War I, but sources do not indicate if Tonené benefited from the company.

Tonené was succeeded as head chief by John Paul, though Tonené continued to hunt and trap in Abitibi country. Following the 1893 death of John Paul, Tonené once again became head chief, and from 1910 he was the honorary or life chief and the primary advisor to the new head chief, his younger brother Frank White Bear.

Personal life 
In 1860, Tonené married Angèle, the daughter of former Temagami band chief Nebenegwune. They had two sons and two daughters and she died in childbirth in 1869. In 1871, Tonené married Elisabeth Pikossekat of Timiskaming band and they had three daughters.

Both of Tonené's sons died before adulthood, although his five daughters all lived into adulthood, married and had children.

Death and legacy 
Tonené died on March 15, 1916, near Lake Abitibi, Quebec. He was buried close to Mount Kanasuta, Quebec near the Quebec–Ontario border. The location of his burial was later turned into a gravel pit and then later into a community dump.

In 2016, the lake south of Bear Lake and north of Larder Lake was officially renamed as Chief Tonene Lake.

References 

1916 deaths
Canadian gold prospectors
Indigenous leaders in Ontario
People from Temagami
Algonquin people
History of mining in Canada
1840s births
Hudson's Bay Company people
History of Temagami
Mining in Temagami
Canadian fur traders
Upper Canada people